This was the first edition of the tournament.

Xenia Knoll and Samantha Murray Sharan won the title, defeating Conny Perrin and Joanne Züger in the final, 6–3, 6–2.

Seeds

Draw

Draw

References
Main Draw

Koper Open - Doubles